Eoghan O'Donnell (born 1995) is an Irish hurler who plays for Dublin Senior Championship club Whitehall Colmcille and at inter-county level with the Dublin senior hurling team. He usually lines out as a full-back. He was born in Harare, Zimbabwe, where his parents were teachers and working for a charity.

Career statistics

Honours

Dublin
Leinster Under-21 Hurling Championship (1): 2016
Leinster Minor Hurling Championship (1): 2012

References

External links
Eoghan O'Donnell profile at the Dublin GAA website

1995 births
Living people
Whitehall Colmcille hurlers
Whitehall Colmcille Gaelic footballers
Dublin inter-county hurlers
DCU hurlers